"Deadlier Than the Male" is a song written by American singer-songwriter Scott Walker under his real name of Scott Engel with UK record producer Johnny Franz. The song was first recorded and released by Walker's pop group The Walker Brothers as their eighth single in 1966. The accompaniment was directed by Reg Guest. The song was the title track for the 1967 British action film Deadlier Than the Male which featured the character of Bulldog Drummond.

The song's title is a reference to the 1911 Rudyard Kipling poem "The Female of the Species," which includes the line, "The female of the species must be deadlier than the male", and also refers to Sapper's earlier Drummond book The Female of the Species.

"Deadlier Than the Male" was a minor hit spending six weeks on the UK Singles Chart and peaking at No. 32. The single was released concurrently that December with the EP Solo John/Solo Scott. The low sales of the single may have been hit by the label's strategy of releasing them both at once.

The single is essentially a Scott Walker solo release as he sang lead vocals and wrote/co-wrote both tracks. Previously Scott had only contributed album tracks and b-sides. "Deadlier Than the Male" is also notable for having been Walker's first A-side.

Track listing

Chart positions

References

1966 singles
The Walker Brothers songs
Songs written by Scott Walker (singer)
Film theme songs
1966 songs